Besant is an unincorporated community in Saskatchewan.

References

 
 

Unincorporated communities in Saskatchewan